Gobind Singh Deo s/o Karpal Singh (born 19 June 1973) is a Malaysian politician and lawyer who served as the Minister of Communications and Multimedia in the Pakatan Harapan (PH) administration under former Prime Minister Mahathir Mohamad from May 2018 to the collapse of the PH administration in February 2020. He has served as the Member of Parliament (MP) for Damansara since November 2022 and for Puchong from March 2008 to November 2022. He is a member and National Deputy Chairman of the Democratic Action Party (DAP), a component party of the PH coalition. Dubbed the "little lion of Puchong", He is the son of the former DAP leader Karpal Singh, who was known as the "Tiger of Jelutong". His brothers, Ramkarpal Singh and Jagdeep Singh Deo, are also DAP leaders. In 2018, he made history by becoming the first Malaysian federal minister from the Sikh community.

Early life, education and early career 
Gobind was born on 19 June 1973 in Penang, Malaysia. He received his Bachelor of Laws (LLB) from University of Warwick.

He by profession is a law practitioner and found his law firm Gobind Singh Deo & Co. based in Damansara, Kuala Lumpur. The firm is operated together with his members lawyers. He was admitted to the Malaysian Bar in 1996, a year after returning from Lincoln's Inn.

Political career

Gobind Singh was elected to Parliament at the 2008 election, unseating the Barisan Nasional incumbent Lau Yeng Peng amid a significant swing to the opposition in Selangor. In 2009 he was suspended from Parliament for 12 months for calling the Prime Minister, Najib Razak, a "murderer" in a parliamentary debate and insulting the deputy speaker. He later won a legal challenge seeking to be paid his normal remuneration for his period of suspension. He was re-elected to Parliament, with an increased margin, at the 2013 election, and also retained his seat at the 2018 election.

Following Pakatan Harapan's victory in the elections over the incumbent Barisan Nasional in 2018, Gobind Singh was appointed Minister of Communication and Multimedia, and was sworn in on 21 May 2018. Gobind Singh is the first Malaysian Sikh be appointed to the Malaysian cabinet.

As of GE 15 Gobind Singh gain a huge margin victory(142,875 Votes)  against Lim Si Ching (Gerakan) ( 18,256 Votes) and Tan Gim Tuan (MCA) ( 13,806 Votes).

Appointment as Deputy Chairman 
On 20 March 2022, on the 17th DAP National Congress, Gobind Singh was re-elected into the Central Executive Committee with 1782 votes, the highest vote. He was then appointed as DAP's Deputy Chairman under Chairman Lim Guan Eng.

Election results

See also 
 Puchong (federal constituency)
 Damansara (federal constituency)

References 

Living people
1973 births
People from Penang
Malaysian people of Punjabi descent
Malaysian politicians of Indian descent
Malaysian Sikhs
20th-century Malaysian lawyers
Democratic Action Party (Malaysia) politicians
Members of the Dewan Rakyat
Government ministers of Malaysia
21st-century Malaysian politicians
21st-century Malaysian lawyers